National Day (Jawi: هاري) is a national holiday in Brunei commemorating the anniversary of Brunei's proclamation of independence. It was made a national holiday by government decree in 1985. Although Brunei broke away from the United Kingdom on 1 January 1984, it wasn't until February that Brunei was totally free of British control.

History

Background 

In 1888, Brunei signed a deal with the British to come under their protection in order to ensure its own political survival. As piracy and rebellion threatened the internal order of the kingdom and Sarawak's White Rajahs encroached on the borders, Sultan Hashim Jalilul Alam Aqamaddin petitioned the British government for help to slow the rapid collapse of Brunei's land. The British residency was established in 1906, and Brunei remained under their rule for an additional 53 years. The Constitution Agreement, which abolished the residence requirement and established internal self-government while leaving Britain in charge of defense and foreign policy, was signed with the United Kingdom in 1959, marking the beginning of the country's journey toward independence. The timeframe for independence was established by subsequent treaties with the United Kingdom in 1971 and 1979.

1 January 1984 
At 12:01 in the morning of 1 January 1984, Sultan Hassanal Bolkiah read the Declaration of Independence:

Upon the reading of the proclamation, Omar Ali Saifuddien III, the father of His Majesty, led three cries of "Allahu Akbar" among the 30,000 people gathered at the padang (present day Taman Haji Sir Muda Omar Ali Saifuddien). A 21-gun salute was fired to celebrate the event, and the sounds of the hadrah resounded around the field. That evening, the capital Bandar Seri Begawan was packed to the gills with people praying for a smooth handover outside the Sultan Omar Ali Saifuddin Mosque and the field despite the heavy rain. Notwithstanding the fact that Brunei proclaimed its independence on 1 January, the date for National Day was chosen as 23 February. Hassanal Bolkiah National Stadium was chosen as the location for the celebrations. The Acting Chief Minister (Menteri Besar), Abdul Aziz, presided over the preparations.

Attendance 
Several key figures of the Commonwealth and countries' representatives attended the celebration, such as:

 Charles, Prince of Wales
 Tāufaʻāhau Tupou IV, King of Tonga
 Suharto, President of Indonesia 
 Ferdinand Marcos, President of the Philippines
 Zia-ul-Haq, President of Pakistan

Themes 
There have been multiple themes used for the celebration of national day such as;

References

External links 

February observances
Brunei
British Borneo
1985 in Brunei
Public holidays in Brunei